Jean-Daniel Boissonnat (born 18 May 1953) is a French computer scientist, who works as a director of research at the French Institute for Research in Computer Science and Automation (INRIA).
He is an invited professor of computational geometry at the Collège de France, holding the Chair in Informatics and Computational Sciences for 2016–2017.

Boissonat was one of the founders of the CGAL project for implementing geometric algorithms.
With Mariette Yvinec, he is the author of the book Algorithmic Geometry (Cambridge University Press, 1998, translated from a 1995 edition in French). With Yvinec and Frédéric Chazal, he is the coauthor of Geometric and Topological Inference (Cambridge University Press, 2018).

Awards and honours 
 1987: IBM award in Computer Science
 2006: EADS award in Information Sciences
 2006: Knight of National Order of Merit
 2013: ANR Digital Technology Award

References

External links

French computer scientists
Researchers in geometric algorithms
1953 births
Living people